"Already Won" is a song by American rapper Rod Wave from his third studio album SoulFly (2021), appearing on the deluxe version. The song features American rapper Lil Durk and was produced by Will-A-Fool. It samples "Can You Stand the Rain" by New Edition.

Composition
In the song, Rod Wave and Lil Durk "flex on their exes" and reflect on balancing their relationships and fame, over a piano sample of "Can You Stand the Rain".

Music video
The official music video premiered on September 28, 2021. It opens with a short monologue, in which Rod Wave talks about a childhood dream to become a drug dealer, and how the losses he experienced in pursuing it led to his decision to go into music instead. He and Lil Durk rap in spaces of a dimly lit room. Their performance is juxtaposed with recreated scenes from Wave's youth: standing around a casket with his family, visiting his father in prison, and lying in bed and dreaming about the future.

Charts

References

2021 singles
2021 songs
Rod Wave songs
Songs written by Rod Wave
Lil Durk songs
Songs written by Lil Durk